Chinbat Nomin (Mongolia: Чинбатын НОМИН; born on June 10, 1983) is a Mongolian politician who has been the Mongolian Minister of Culture since January 29, 2021.

Early life 
Nomin was born and grew up in Ulaanbaatar, Mongolia.

Nomin studied in the United Kingdom first at Abbey College Cambridge and then the University of East Anglia where she received her Bachelor of Arts in Economics and Accounting in 2006. Nomin is also a graduate of Harvard Business School in 2018.

Career prior to politics 
Prior to assuming her ministerial position, Nomin worked in media and hospitality.

In 2008, Nomin established the Terelj Hotel Ulaanbaatar, Mongolia's first five-star hotel and a member of Small Luxury Hotels of the World. It was awarded World Luxury Hotel of the Year – Mongolia in 2010.

In 2009, she founded Mongol TV and was its CEO until January 2021. Mongol TV quickly became the most viewed independent channel in Mongolia. During her time at Mongol TV, Nomin introduced global television programs, such as Mongolia's Got Talent, The Apprentice Mongolia and The Voice Mongolia.

A fierce advocate for independent media, in 2015 Nomin was elected Founding Chair of the first self-regulatory press ombudsman, the Mongolia Media Council. Nomin was selected as one of the "Top 25 Women in Television" by the Hollywood Reporter in 2013. She left her roles at Mongol TV and the Mongolia Media Council in 2021 when she accepted her current government role.

Additionally, Nomin is a Young Global Leader with the World Economic Forum. She was listed as one of Forbes Mongolia's "30 under 30" in 2017.

Career in Government 
In January 2021, Nomin was appointed as the Minister of Culture for the Government of Mongolia by Prime Minister Luvsannamsrain Oyun-Erdene. As the Minister of Culture, Nomin is responsible for overseeing the delivery of cultural events and preserving Mongolian culture.

Following the announcement of Mongolia's Vision 2050 and the New Recovery Policy, Nomin has lead responsibility for the key role of Mongolian culture during this period of development and industrialization, promoting Mongolian culture and arts abroad and encouraging international tourism to the country.

In her role, Nomin has spearheaded a number of initiatives to encourage further development of Mongolia's creative industries, including the introduction of legislation in Mongolia's parliament to establish the Mongolian National Film Council and a range of competitive tax rebates for international movie production in Mongolia – a move the Parliament approved in July 2021.

In May 2022, it was announced that Nomin would lead a delegation of Mongolian filmmakers and other industry figures to the Cannes Film Festival for the launch of the Mongolian National Film Council (MNFC).

Personal life 
Nomin is married and has three children.

References

1983 births
Living people
Alumni of the University of East Anglia
Harvard Business School alumni
21st-century Mongolian politicians
21st-century Mongolian women politicians
Culture ministers of Mongolia
Women government ministers of Mongolia
People from Ulaanbaatar